Zatrephes mossi is a moth in the family Erebidae. It was described by Walter Rothschild in 1933. It is found in Brazil.

References

Phaegopterina
Moths described in 1933